Stony Point District School No. 4, also known as the Pyngyp School, is a historic one-room school building located near Stony Point in Rockland County, New York. It was built about 1915, and is a one-story, rectangular wood-frame building with modest Gothic style detailing.  It has a steeply pitched gable roof topped by belfry and two entry doors.  A rear frame addition was constructed in the 1970s.  The school closed in 1945, after which it was used as a community center.

It was listed on the National Register of Historic Places in 2012.

References

One-room schoolhouses in New York (state)
School buildings on the National Register of Historic Places in New York (state)
Gothic Revival architecture in New York (state)
School buildings completed in 1915
Schools in Rockland County, New York
National Register of Historic Places in Rockland County, New York
1915 establishments in New York (state)